Manuel Mancini may refer to:

 Manuel Mancini (footballer) (born 1983), Italian footballer
 Manuel Mancini (sport shooter) (born 1982), target shooter from San Marino